Poliqarp is an open source search engine designed to process text corpora, among others the National Corpus of Polish created at the Institute of Computer Science, Polish Academy of Sciences.

Features
 Custom query language
 Two-level regular expressions:
 operating at the level of characters in words
 operating at the level of words in statements/paragraphs
 Good performance
 Compact corpus representation (compared to similar projects)
 Portability across operating systems: Linux/BSD/Win32
 Lack of portability across endianness (current release works only on little endian devices)

References

External links
 Polish corpus website (in English)
 Project website on SourceForge
 Search plugin for Firefox

Information retrieval systems